2020–21 Zamalek SC was a season of the Zamalek club. The club competes for local championships such as the League, Cup and Continental in the Basketball Africa League because it is the champion of the 2019 League.

Rosters

Egyptian Super League roster

BAL roster
The following was Zamalek's 13-man roster for the 2021 BAL season.

Egyptian Basketball Super League

Super League promotion match
Source:

It is a match between two teams previously determined in a related league, the winner of the Super League plays to compete for the league championship, and the loser competes with seven other teams to avoid relegation.

Home Match
Saturday 16 January 2021

Away Match
Tuesday 19 January 2021

Regular season

Top Group

Matches
Source:

First round
Day 1
Saturday 30 January 2021

Mostafa Kejo (25 Points)
Walter Hodge (22 Points)
Anas Osama (16 Points)
Islam Salem (15 Points)
Day 2
Tuesday 2 February 2021

Day 3
Monday 1 March 2021

Day 4
Friday 5 March 2021

Day 5
Monday 8 March 2021

Day 6
Friday 12 March 2021

Day 7
Monday 15 March 2021

Second round

Day 8
Friday 19 March 2021

Walter Hodge (34 Points)
Mostafa Kejo (15 Points)
Anas Osama (14 Points)
Mohab Yasser (12 Points)
Day 9
Monday 22 March 2021

Day 10
Friday 26 March 2021

Mostafa Kejo (26 Points)
Anas Osama (16 Points)
Mohab Yasser (15 Points)
Walter Hodge (12 Points)
Day 11
Monday 29 March 2021

The match was calculated for Al-Ahly 20-0 after its objection to the attendance of fans of the Zamalek club, and according to the regulations of the Egyptian Federation, the presence of the fans is prohibited 

Day 12
Friday 2 April 2021

Day 13
Monday 5 April 2021

Day 14
Thursday 8 April 2021

Walter Hodge (23 Points)
Mostafa Kejo (12 Points)
Omar Hesham (12 Points)
Islam Salem (8 Points)
Anas Osama (6 Points)
Mohab Yasser (6 Points)

Playoffs
The playoffs started on 16 April 2021.

Bracket

Quarterfinals

|}

Semi-finals

|}
Top Score
Walter Hodge (81 Points), (10 Rebounds), (18 Assists)
Islam Salem (45 Points), (16 Rebounds), (3 Assists)
Anas Osama (27 Points), (28 Rebounds), (11 Assists)
Mohab Yasser (24 Points), (12 Rebounds), (7 Assists)
Omar Hesham (20 Points), (6 Rebounds), (6 Assists)
Mostafa Kejo (18 Points), (24 Rebounds), (4 Assists)
mohammed mostafa hegazi (10 Points), (18 Rebounds), (6 Assists)

Finals

|}

Game summaries
Game 1

Game 2

Game 3

Game 4

Game 5

Player statistics

|-
! scope="row" style="text-align:left;|
| 5 || 5 || 00.0 || .000 || .000 || .000 || 1.6 || 3.4 || 1.4 || 0.0 || 19
|-
! scope="row" style="text-align:left;"|
| 5 || 0 || 00.0 || .000 || .000 || .000 || 3.8 || 0.2 || 0.8 || 0.0 || 2.8
|-
! scope="row" style="text-align:left;"|
| 5 || 5 || 00.0 || .000 || .000 || .000 || 4.6 || 1.2 || 1.8 || 0.2 || 12.2
|-
! scope="row" style="text-align:left;"|
| 5 || 5 || 00.0 || .000 || .000 || .000 || 10 || 5.4 || 1.2 || 1.6 || 6.4
|-
! scope="row" style="text-align:left;"|
| 5 || 5 || 00.0 || .000 || .000 || .000 || 7.6 || 0.8 || 0.6 || 0.0 || 10
|-
! scope="row" style="text-align:left;"|
| 5 || 5 || 00.0 || .000 || .000 || .000 || 2.8 || 2.0 || 1.0 || 0.0 || 11.6
|-
! scope="row" style="text-align:left;"|
| 5 || 0 || 00.0 || .000 || .000 || .000 || 2.8 || 2.0 || 0.2 || 0.0 || 2.6
|-
! scope="row" style="text-align:left;"|
| 2 || 0 || 00.0 || .000 || .000 || .000 || 0.0 || 0.0 || 0.0 || 0.0 || 0.0
|-
! scope="row" style="text-align:left;"|
| 5 || 0 || 00.0 || .000 || .000 || .000 || 1.2 || 0.4 || 0.4 || 0.0 || 4.4
|-
! scope="row" style="text-align:left;"|
| 5 || 0 || 00.0 || .000 || .000 || .000 || 1.6 || 0.0 || 0.6 || 0.2 || 4.4
|-
! scope="row" style="text-align:left;"|
| 2 || 0 || 00.0 || .000 || .000 || .000 || 1.5 || 1.0 || 0.0 || 0.0 || 3.0

Basketball Africa League

Group phase

Standings

Games

Playoffs

Quarterfinals

Semifinals

Finals

References

Zamalek SC seasons